Shahe is a town in the northeast of Gao County, southeastern Sichuan Province in Southwest China, located  southeast of the city of Yibin. In 2009, it administered 26 villages. It is the home of Shahe tofu (沙河豆腐), one of the better known food products of Southern Sichuan that is also tender and features brilliant colours  and Shahe Salted Duck (沙河板鸭).

References

Township-level divisions of Sichuan